WCMC-FM (99.9 MHz) is a sports radio station based in Raleigh, North Carolina and licensed to nearby Holly Springs.  Its studios are located in north Raleigh along with WRAL-FM, an adult contemporary music station, two sports talk stations WDNC (620 The Buzz) and WCLY (1550 The Buzz) (simulcasted on HD2 and HD3. All are owned and operated by Capitol Broadcasting Company which also owns NBC television affiliate WRAL-TV, Fox affiliate WRAZ-TV (FOX 50), and the Durham Bulls minor-league baseball team, among other properties.

WCMC-FM transmits from an antenna located in the Auburn community southeast of Raleigh, on a tower shared with WRDC, WRAL-FM, and WQDR-FM. The station also broadcasts in HD Radio.

History
Prior to 2005, this station was WFXQ in Chase City, Virginia, one of several southern Virginia stations purchased by former Raleigh radio host Tom Joyner in 2001. For 11 years prior to Joyner's purchase of the station, it was a country music station known as "99.9 The Fox". During Joyner's years as owner, the station was black gospel as "Rejoice Radio 99.9" and adult standards as "Stardust 99.9." Joyner sold WFXQ to Capitol Broadcasting, and the Stardust format moved to WSHV in South Hill, Virginia, one of several Joyner-owned stations purchased by Lakes Media. WFXQ got permission to move its city of license to Creedmoor and increase its power to 22,000 watts. 
 

WCMC signed on the air in October 2005 with a country music format called "99.9 Genuine Country". The slogan was "Country Favorites From Today and Yesterday" and it played a mix of new country and older country

In October 2006, WCMC moved to another tower, taller than the previous one, but reduced its power to 8,000 watts.

On September 10, 2007, at 9 PM, WCMC began stunting with a classic rock format. On October 10, at 3 PM, the sports format debuted, known as "99.9 The Fan."  In September 2009, Capitol Broadcasting purchased 620 WDNC from McClatchey broadcasting.  Along with the purchase came nearly the entire staff of WRBZ (850 The Buzz – sister station to WDNC).  Brian Maloney, who started the sports talk format in the Raleigh-Durham market and was the general manager of WDNC/WRBZ,  was hired by Capitol to spearhead the integration of both WDNC and WCMC.

Since moving to the Triangle, WCMC had broadcast from an antenna located 485 feet above ground level located three miles northwest of Youngsville.  The short tower and relatively modest power resulted in the station providing only grade B coverage to Chapel Hill, Garner, Cary and most of Durham. In 2010 WCMC was granted permission to move its city of license to Holly Springs and boost its power to 26,500 watts, providing a fairly strong city-grade signal to all of Wake County and most of Durham County.  However, Chapel Hill, the third point in the Triangle, still gets only a grade B signal.  This may be due to the need to protect WMAG in High Point, at nearby 99.5.

On June 16, 2015, WCMC FM was awarded North Carolina Large Market Station of the Year by the North Carolina Association of Broadcasters.

In 2016, WCMC-FM was a national finalist for Sports Station of The Year – NAB.

HD channels
On February 29, 2016, WCLY  relaunched as an English-language sports station, "1550 the Ticket". The station featured a mix of sports programming from ESPN Radio, CBS Sports Radio, and Fox Sports Radio, which also aired on the WCMC-FM HD3 channel. ESPN Deportes continued to air on HD4.

On May 1, 2018, WDNC rebranded from "The Buzz" (which continues on WCMC-HD2 and the 96.5 and 99.3 translators) to "The Ticket" (moved from WCLY and still aired on the WCMC-FM HD3 channel).

On its HD-4 channel, WCMC rebroadcasts Durham-based WDUR 1490 AM's South Asia Radio format.

On August 4, 2022, The HD2 programming was dropped from the 96.5 and 99.3 translators.

Sports
WCMC has been the flagship station for the Carolina Hurricanes since 2007, following a two-year run on Curtis Media-owned WWMY. The games are a straight simulcast of Bally Sports South/Southeast (formerly FOX Sports Carolinas).  In addition, the station broadcasts the weekly football and basketball coaches shows for the NC State Wolfpack, while sister station WRAL-FM will broadcast the games.

On November 30, 2008, WCMC became an ESPN Radio affiliate. This follows the decision by McClatchey Broadcasting to discontinue ESPN programming on its two sports talk stations, WDNC and WRBZ, because of ESPN's insistence on the stations airing more ESPN programming than the company wanted to.  This dispute ended when Capitol bought WDNC.

On April 1, 2009, WCMC became the new flagship station of the Durham Bulls.  They are expected to carry the full allotment of 144 during the season, along with playoff games, although some games may be moved over to their HD channel on dates that might conflict with a Carolina Hurricanes broadcast.

On May 13, 2010, it was announced that WCMC would become the Triangle affiliate for the Carolina Panthers Radio Network.

References

External links
99.9 The Fan website
99.9 Genuine Rock? WCMC gets ready for sports transition.
Capital broadcasting to launch sports radio station – Triangle Business Journal

Sports radio stations in the United States
ESPN Radio stations
CMC-FM
Capitol Broadcasting Company
Radio stations established in 1993